Siġġiewi F.C. is a football club from the village of Siġġiewi in Malta. Founded in 1945, it currently plays in the Maltese National Amateur League. Their home kit colours are red and yellow.

History 

The first football team in Siggiewi was formed in 1945 by a group of amateurs, who used to play casual football in a field at Ta' Kandja. Reggie Pace, Ninu Mallia and Freddie Curmi were the main promoters of the game. Mr Emilio Camilleri, who had settled in the village during the war period and was an influential person within the circles of the Malta Football Association, helped the team to be admitted in the 3rd division of the Maltese Football League. 

Mr Karmenu Vassallo was nominated as first president of the club, and he retained the post for the next eight consecutive years. Mr Nicholas Pace was chosen as the first secretary. Thereafter, several other persons held these posts. Gozitan-born Mr Anthony Buttigieg, for instance, served as president for 23 years and in 1987 he was nominated honorary president for life. Mr Reggie Pace and the well-known sports personality Mr John Debattista, both occupied the post of secretary for many years. 

In 1972, Siggiewi FC managed to obtain on lease the land at Hesri, where the present Siggiewi Ground now stands. The team continued to play in the 3rd Division for many years until, in 1970–71, they became Division III (Sec. A) Champions for the first time and were promoted to the 2nd Division. They won the 3rd Division Championship again in 1973–74 and once more in 1989–90. In the 1996–97 season, Siggiewi FC were promoted for the first time to the 1st Division and played in that division for 2 seasons, but reverted to the lower divisions after 1998–99.

Siġġiewi Sports Complex 
As part of the MFA programme of assisting member clubs and affiliated associations to improve their facilities, the association's President Norman Darmanin Demajo inaugurated a synthetic pitch at Siġġiewi which will serve the locality's footballers, including the youths and youngsters in the nursery, in their development. The synthetic pitch was inaugurated during the 2010/2011 season.

Present for the ceremony were Siġġiewi F.C President and Committee, Robert Musumeci (former mayor of Siġġiewi) and Clyde Puli (former parliamentary secretary for youth and sport).

Youth sector 
Siġġiewi is also the mother club of its nursery, the Siġġiewi Football Club Youth Nursery. The youth nursery, caters for children aged between 5 and 16 years, was established in 1992 and is affiliated with the Malta Youth Football Association. The youth nursery participates in the under-15 league organised by the Malta Youth FA.

Players

Senior squad 2021–2022
Note: The same squad number may be used by more than one player. If that is the case, the last player who have used the number is assigned with it.

Club officials and coaching staff

Achievements 

Maltese Third Division: 1970–71, 1973–74, 1989–90

Club statistics and records

League and cup history 

^ Siġġiewi, as winners of Section A, faced the winners of section B, Għargħur, in a play-off to determine the overall winners of the Third Division. Siġġiewi lost the match by three goals to two and therefore ended as runners-up.

Player statistics – most appearances 

Updated as at 1 April 2018.

References

Literature
 Carmel Vella, SIGGIEWI (Città Ferdinand)- A Profile of History, Social Life and Traditions.

External links
 

Association football clubs established in 1945
Football clubs in Malta
1945 establishments in Malta
Siġġiewi